Xu Kun (徐坤; born 1965) is a Chinese postmodern fiction writer based in Beijing. She is currently the deputy chair of Beijing Writers Association. She was born in Shenyang and holds a Ph.D. in literature from Chinese Academy of Social Sciences. She received her bachelor's and master's degrees from Liaoning University.

Works translated to English

"Kitchen" received the Lu Xun Literary Prize in 2000.

References

Chinese women short story writers
20th-century Chinese short story writers
21st-century Chinese short story writers
Writers from Shenyang
1965 births
Living people
Chinese Academy of Social Sciences alumni
Liaoning University alumni
20th-century Chinese women writers
21st-century Chinese women writers
Postmodern writers
People's Republic of China short story writers
Short story writers from Liaoning